The Association of Structural Engineers of the Philippines, Inc. abbreviated as ASEP is an organization of structural engineers of the Philippines affiliated with the Philippine Institute of Civil Engineers.

Background
ASEP was established in 1961 to promote the advancement of Filipino civil engineers in the field of structural engineering. The publication of the National Structural Code of the Philippines (NSCP) and the referral codes of the Philippine National Building Code were published by the organization.

Advocacy
ASEP exists in the advancement of structural engineering in the Philippines as well as upholding ethical values in the promotion of national and international professional collaboration with governments, industry and the academe.

The organization specifically lobbies on legislation of the Philippines in the national and local levels.

Notable publications

 National Structural Code of the Philippines
 National Building Code of the Philippines
ASEP Steel Handbook

References

Professional associations based in the Philippines
Civil engineering professional associations
Structural engineering